The Delta County Bank Building, on Main Street in Delta, Colorado, is a Romanesque Revival-style building constructed in 1892.  It was listed on the National Register of Historic Places in 1993.

It has historically served as a department store, as a professional building, as a meeting hall, in addition to serving as a financial institution.

It is a two-story masonry building with a three -story corner tower, which somewhat dominates downtown Delta.

References

Bank buildings on the National Register of Historic Places in Colorado
National Register of Historic Places in Delta County, Colorado
Romanesque Revival architecture in Colorado
Commercial buildings completed in 1892